Edouard Machery is a French-American philosopher and distinguished professor in the Department of History and Philosophy of Science at the University of Pittsburgh.

Early life and education 
Edouard Machery received a Ph.D. in philosophy at the Université de Paris-Sorbonne in 2004.

Career and works 
The research works of Edouard Machery are in philosophy, experimental philosophy, and cognitive science especially about concepts. According to his theory, the notion of concept is ill-suited for a scientific psychology. Therefore, he criticizes the neo-empiricist accounts of concepts. He has also worked on the experimental psychology, with a special focus on external validity and statistics. He has also worked on the theories of human cognition.

His works are on various topics, including the processes as categorization and concept learning. The experimental philosophy is another topic on which he has worked. He has used experimental and quasi-experimental methods in order to determine the characteristics of intuition and folk judgments about intentional action.

Books 
 Doing without concepts
 Philosophy within its proper bounds

Reviews of works 
The works of Edouard Machery have been reviewed by other cognitive scientists.

Awards 
Edouard Machery was awarded the Chancellor's Distinguished Research Award by the Pittsburgh University in 2011. He was also awarded the Stanton Prize by the Society for Philosophy and Psychology in 2013. In 2022, he was elected President of the Society for Philosophy and Psychology for 2023-2024.

References

External links 
Website of the University of Pittsburgh, visited in 2017.
Website of the Notre Dame Philosophical Reviews, visited in 2017
Website of Edouard Machery

Year of birth missing (living people)
Living people
21st-century American philosophers
French cognitive scientists
Paris-Sorbonne University alumni
University of Pittsburgh faculty